Renato Balduzzi (born 12 February 1955) is an Italian academic and politician. He served as the Italian minister of health under Prime Minister Mario Monti from November 2011 to April 2013.

Early life
Renato Balduzzi was born on 12 February 1955 in Voghera, Italy.

Career
Prior to becoming minister, Balduzzi was a professor of constitutional law in the Università Cattolica del Sacro Cuore. He taught at the various universities, including University of Eastern Piedmont, the University of Genoa, the University of Turin, Paris 12 Val de Marne University, the University of the South, Toulon-Var, and Paul Cézanne University Aix-Marseille III.

On 16 November 2011, Balduzzi was named minister of health in the Mario Monti's technocratic government. In 2013, he joined Civic Choice (SC), Monti's new-founded party. In the Italian general election of 25 February 2013, he was elected deputy on With Monti for Italy coalition's lists, electoral district 2 in region Piedmont. Balduzzi's term as health minister ended on 28 April 2013 and Beatrice Lorenzin replaced him in the post.

Personal life
Balduzzi is married, and he has three children.

Honors
Medaglia teresiana, University of Pavia, (2012)

References

1955 births
Living people
People from Voghera
Civic Choice politicians
Italian Ministers of Health
Deputies of Legislature XVII of Italy
Politicians of Lombardy
Academic staff of the Università Cattolica del Sacro Cuore
Academic staff of the University of Genoa
Academic staff of the University of Turin